This is a list of crossings of the Cape Cod Canal from its north end in Cape Cod Bay to its southern end in Buzzards Bay. The canal, which was opened in 1914, shortened the route from New York City to Boston by 62 miles.

Crossings

References

See also 
 Cape Cod Canal Tunnel
 Third Cape Cod Canal road bridge

Bridges in Massachusetts
Crossings
Bridge crossings
Cape Cod Canal
Canals, crossings